Pippig is a surname. Notable people with the surname include:

Regina Pippig (born 1947), German sprinter
Uta Pippig (born 1965), German long-distance runner

See also
Pippin (name), given name and surname